The Annual NASA Convention is the annual get together of National Association of Students of Architecture. It is a four-day-long event held towards the end of January and is attended by around 5,000 students. Called Annual NASA when it was started sixty years ago, the convention has gone on to become an integral part of all architecture colleges not only in India but as well as in the SAARC Nation. The Annual NASA Convention in 2016 was hosted by Gijubhai Chhaganbhai Patel Institute of Architecture (GCPIA), VNSGU, Surat from 1 to 5 February 2016.

History of NASA
The National Association of Students of Architecture has been hosting an annual conventions for the past 55 years.
The convention is awarded to a college by the Executive Council of the association to host it. Initially it was to happen every alternate year, when it was first hosted by JJ College of Architecture in 1957.

Time
The ANC takes place during four days near the month of January. The event starts with an inauguration ceremony, which is then followed by the paneling of sheets, various lecture series, workshops and various such other formal and informal activities. last year it was 57th Annual NASA Convention which was hosted by Marg Institute of Design and Architecture Swarnabhoomi, Kancheepuram, Chennai. which was most successful ANC event in last decade.

Events and Workshops
With more than hundred events, NASA Convention offers a variety of fare to choose from for both the participants who are out to chill out and those who come for serious competition, in almost any literary or cultural activity

Lectures and Performances 

NASA Convention sees performances by many renowned artistes who come from around the world. It is also a platform where eminent personalities share their experiences or their take on a wide range of topics. Last edition of the Annual NASA saw lectures by eminent architect like BV Doshi, Christopher Charles Beninger and Fumihiko maki.

Competitions 

The Annual NASA sees a variety of competitions in a wide range of fields like drawing, painting, elocution, quizzes and many more. People come from across the country to showcase their talents. Apart from these events NASA has its own set of trophies associated with some association for which the colleges compete.

ISO 9001:2008

NASA India, in a move to make address to the general complaints like a show starting late, poor remuneration for artists and inhospitable reception that plagues most of the nationwide cultural events in India, started collecting feedback from the participants over the years and started addressing these concerns. NASA India got ISO 9001:2008 certification in the year 2012.

Organisation
NASA is a completely non-profit organisation managed entirely by the Unit Secretaries of all member colleges of  National Association of Students of Architecture. The organisational structure of NASA comprises the Executive Council and the General Council. This Executive council is elected from the General Council at the end of every annual convention.

List of previous conventions
2023 (Feb)65nd Annual NASA convention(comeing soon)
2022 (June)64th Annual NASA convention ,Christ University Benglore
2020 (Feb7-10) 62nd Annual NASA convention, Innovative Film City, Benglore
2019 (jan18-jan23) 61st Annual NASA Convention SJBIT, Bengalore 
2018 (Jan29- Feb2) 60th Annual NASA Convention DC School of Architecture and design, Vagamon, Idukki, Kerala
2017 (Jan15-20) 59th Annual NASA Convention at Poornima University, Jaipur
2016 (Feb 1-5) 58th Annual NASA Convention at Gijubhai Chhaganbhai Patel Institute of Architecture (GCPIA), VNSGU, Surat
2015 57th Annual NASA Convention at Marg Institute of Design and Architecture Swarnabhoomi (MIDAS), Kancheepuram, Chennai (The evening started with a fantastic opening ceremony tracing the architecture and most successful) 
2014 56th Annual NASA Convention (Contextual of Time, Space and People) was conducted by the Vaishnavi School of Architecture & Planning at Hitex, Hyderabad.
2013 (January) 55th Annual NASA Convention, held at Gateway College of Architecture.
2012 (Jan 27-30) 54th Annual NASA Convention, Ahmedabad. 
2011 53rd Annual NASA Convention Utopia 10' held at BVBCET, Hubli.
2010 52rd Annual NASA Convention at SRM, Chennai.
2007 50th Annual NASA Convention in M.A.N.I.T Bhopal.
2006/2007 (January) 49th Annual NASA Convention at MIT Manipal
2005 ‘Pulse 2005’ The 48th Annual Convention of National Association of Students of Architecture (NASA), hosted by Academy of Architecture, Mumbai
2004 ‘Srijan ‘04’ The 47th Annual Convention of National Association of Students of Architecture (NASA), hosted by Madhav Institute of Technology & Science (MITS), Gwalior
2001 (Dec 26to 29) 44th annual convention in Mumbai
1999 (December) “Sustainability and Architecture”   42nd Annual NASA Millennium Convention, Bangalore
1998 (Dec 22-25) 41 st NASA Convention XENOS '98 at the School of Architecture and Planning, Chennai
1997 (Dec 17-20) Vastutsav hosted by Rizvi College of Architecture, Mumbai. VASTUTSAV was held at the Andheri Sports Complex from Dec 17–20, 1997. The evening started with a fantastic opening ceremony tracing the architecture zeitgeist in India at the time and then culminating in a 45-minute rock show by Remo, a fellow architect and one of India's great artists.
1996 SPA Delhi
1995 VRCE Nagpur (now VNIT, Nagpur)

References

1957 establishments in India
Recurring events established in 1957